Leptonoma is a moth genus, belonging to the family Tineidae. It contains only one species, Leptonoma citrozona, which is found in Malawi.

References

Endemic fauna of Malawi
Tineidae
Monotypic moth genera
Lepidoptera of Malawi
Moths of Sub-Saharan Africa
Tineidae genera
Taxa named by Edward Meyrick